Luthermuir is a village in Aberdeenshire, Scotland, UK.

Historically the village was home to weavers and labourers.

Facilities 
Luthermuir is home to a primary school and a church. There is a single playground, however, it was deemed unsafe and closed by the council in 2020. Residents are currently raising funds for new play equipment. A registered charity, Luthermuir Hall And Park Committee, is based in the village and aims to improve facilities and meeting places for the benefit of residents of Luthermuir and surrounding places.

Transportation 
A bus service connects Luthermuir with Laurencekirk, Auchenblae and Stonehaven. It is situated close to the A90.

Notable residents
Brothers John Souttar and Harry Souttar, both footballers, grew up in the village.

References 

Villages in Aberdeenshire